Kim Sung-hwan (김성환), a.k.a. Kim Seong-hwan, Kim Sǒng-hwan may refer to:
Kim Seong-hwan (pen name Gobau; born 1932), Korean cartoonist
Kim Sung-hwan (diplomat) (born 1953), South Korean foreign minister and diplomat
Kim Sung-hwan (footballer) (born 1986), South Korean footballer